Shannondale may refer to:

Shannondale, Indiana
Shannondale, Chariton County, Missouri
Shannondale, Shannon County, Missouri
Shannondale, West Virginia